James Kenneth Dunaway (September 3, 1941 – May 12, 2018) was an American football player.  A defensive tackle, he played college football at the University of Mississippi, and played professionally in the American Football League for the Buffalo Bills, as part of a defensive line that held opposing runners without a rushing touchdown for a pro football record seventeen consecutive games in the 1964 and 1965 AFL seasons.

Murder charge and aftermath 
On July 27, 1998, Dunaway's ex-wife, Nonniel Dunaway, was found dead in a half-empty swimming pool. An autopsy revealed that she had a fractured skull and was unconscious when she was placed in the water by her assailant where she drowned. They had been divorced since 1995 and Dunaway was planning to appeal.

Dunaway was charged with her murder but a grand jury chose not to indict Dunaway of the charges. In response, his children filed a wrongful death lawsuit, alleging that Dunaway was responsible for their mother's death. In 2002, Dunaway was found liable and ordered to pay $579,000 to his children.

Coincidentally, Dunaway had been a teammate for three seasons of star running back O. J. Simpson, who was similarly found responsible for his ex-wife's death after being acquitted of her murder in a controversial trial in 1995.

See also
Other American Football League players

References

1941 births
2018 deaths
People from Columbia, Mississippi
All-American college football players
American football defensive tackles
Buffalo Bills players
Miami Dolphins players
Jacksonville Sharks (WFL) players
Jacksonville Express players
American Football League All-Star players
Ole Miss Rebels football players
American Football League players
Players of American football from Mississippi